National figure skating championships of the 2018–19 season are taking place mainly between December 2018 and January 2019. They are held to crown national champions and may serve as part of the selection process for international events such as the 2019 ISU Figure Skating Championships and the 2019 Winter Universiade. Medals may be awarded in the disciplines of men's singles, ladies' singles, pair skating, and ice dancing. A few countries chose to organize their national championships together with their neighbors; the results were subsequently divided into national podiums.

Competitions

Senior medalists

Men

Ladies

Pairs

Ice dancing

Junior medalists

Ladies

References

Nationals
Nationals
Figure skating national championships